Liridon Ahmeti (born 16 July 1985, in Vushtrri) is a Kosovar-Albanian footballer who plays as a defender. He played last for Vushtrria in the Football Superleague of Kosovo and he had a short spell with Partizani in the Albanian Superliga.

Club career
Ahmeti returned to Albania to sign a two-year contract with Partizani Tirana.

He left the club in July 2014.

References

1985 births
Living people
Sportspeople from Vushtrri
Kosovo Albanians
Association football fullbacks
Kosovan footballers
KF Flamurtari players
AC Oulu players
Besa Kavajë players
KF Teuta Durrës players
KF Trepça players
KS Shkumbini Peqin players
KF Trepça'89 players
KF Vushtrria players
FK Partizani Tirana players
FC Prishtina players
Football Superleague of Kosovo players
Kategoria Superiore players
Kosovan expatriate footballers
Albanian expatriate footballers
Albanian men's footballers
Expatriate footballers in Finland
Kosovan expatriate sportspeople in Finland
Expatriate footballers in Albania
Kosovan expatriate sportspeople in Albania